Diogo Emanuel Pinto Teixeira (born 20 January 1999) is a Portuguese professional footballer who plays as a midfielder for Sanjoanense.

Club career
Teixeira made his professional debut with Rio Ave in a 3-1 Primeira Liga win over Portimonense on 8 January 2021.

International career
Teixeira is a youth international for Portugal, and was part of the Portugal U19s that won the 2018 UEFA European Under-19 Championship.

References

External links
 
 
 

1999 births
Living people
People from Marco de Canaveses
Portuguese footballers
Portugal youth international footballers
Rio Ave F.C. players
A.D. Sanjoanense players
Primeira Liga players
Campeonato de Portugal (league) players
Association football midfielders
Sportspeople from Porto District